The twenty-second World Masters Athletics Championships were held in Perth Australia, from October 26–November 6, 2016. This was the first even year of the biennial championship as beginning in 2016, the championships moved to be held in even numbered years. The World Masters Athletics Championships serve the division of the sport of athletics for people over 35 years of age, referred to as Masters athletics.

A full range of track and field events were held, along with a cross country race and a marathon.

Results
100 metres
W35 100 metres
Wind: +3.4

W40 100 metres
Wind: +3.8

W45 100 metres
Wind: +1.5

W50 100 metres
Wind: +1.7

W55 100 metres
Wind: +2.3

W60 100 metres
Wind: +2.3

W65 100 metres
Wind: +2.1

W70 100 metres
Wind: +3.6

W75 100 metres
Wind: +0.9

W80 100 metres
Wind: +3.3

W85 100 metres
Wind: +1.9

W90 100 meters
Wind: +1.9

200 metres

W35 200 metres
Wind: +3.5

W40 200 metres
Wind: +3.7

W45 200 metres
Wind: +1.9

W50 200 metres
Wind: +1.6

W55 200 metres
Wind: +3.0

W60 200 metres
Wind: +1.1

W65 200 metres
Wind: +4.1

W70 200 metres
Wind: +2.4

W75 200 metres
Wind: +4.2

W80 200 metres
Wind: +4.4

W85 200 metres
Wind: +2.8

400 metres

W35 400 metres

W40 400 metres

W45 400 metres

W50 400 metres

W55 400 metres

W60 400 metres

W65 400 metres

W70 400 metres

W75 400 metres

W80 400 metres

W85 400 metres

800 metres

W35 800 metres

W40 800 metres

W45 800 metres

W50 800 metres

W55 800 metres

W60 800 metres

W65 800 metres

W70 800 metres

W75 800 metres

W80 800 metres

W85 800 metres

1500 metres

W35 1500 metres

W40 1500 metres

W45 1500 metres

W50 1500 metres

W55 1500 metres

W60 1500 metres

W65 1500 metres

W70 1500 metres

W75 1500 metres

W80 1500 metres

W85 1500 metres

5000 metres

W35 5000 metres

W40 5000 metres

W45 5000 metres

W50 5000 metres

W55 5000 metres

W60 5000 metres

W65 5000 metres

W70 5000 metres

W75 5000 metres

W80 5000 metres

W85 5000 metres

Cross country

W35 8000 metres Cross Country

W40 8000 metres Cross Country

W45 8000 metres Cross Country

W50 8000 metres Cross Country

W55 8000 metres Cross Country

W60 8000 metres Cross Country

W65 8000 metres Cross Country

W70 8000 metres Cross Country

W75 8000 metres Cross Country

W80 8000 metres Cross Country

W85 8000 metres Cross Country

10,000 metres

W35 10000 metres

W40 10000 metres

W45 10000 metres

W50 10000 metres

W55 10000 metres

W60 10000 metres

W65 10000 metres

W70 10000 metres

W75 10000 metres

Half marathon
W35 Half marathon

W40 Half marathon

W45 Half marathon

W50 Half marathon

W55 Half marathon

W60 Half marathon

W65 Half marathon

W70 Half marathon

W75 Half marathon

W80 Half marathon

Marathon
W35 Marathon

W40 Marathon

W45 Marathon

W50 Marathon

W55 Marathon

W60 Marathon

W65 Marathon

W70 Marathon

W75 Marathon

Short hurdles

W40 80 metres hurdles
Wind: +2.5

W45 80 metres hurdles
Wind: +2.8

W50 80 metres hurdles
Wind: -1.0

W55 80 metres hurdles
Wind: +1.1

W60 80 metres hurdles
Wind: +0.7

W65 80 metres hurdles
Wind: -1.9

W70 80 metres hurdles
Wind: -0.9

Note: Maier set the World Record of 15.72 -0.8 in the prelims

W75 80 metres hurdles
Wind: -0.1

W80 80 metres hurdles
Wind: -0.1

W35 100 metres hurdles
Wind: +0.3

Long hurdles

W70 200 metres hurdles
Wind: +1.3

W75 200 metres hurdles
Wind: +2.3

W80 200 metres hurdles
Wind: +2.3

W50 300 metres hurdles

W55 300 metres hurdles

W60 300 metres hurdles

W65 300 metres hurdles

W35 400 metres hurdles

W40 400 metres hurdles

W45 400 metres hurdles

Steeplechase

W35 2000 metres steeplechase

W40 2000 metres steeplechase

W45 2000 metres steeplechase

W50 2000 metres steeplechase

W55 2000 metres steeplechase

W60 2000 metres steeplechase

W65 2000 metres steeplechase

W70 2000 metres steeplechase

W75 2000 metres steeplechase

W80 2000 metres steeplechase

W85 2000 metres steeplechase

4x100 metres relay

W35 4x100 metres relay

W40 4x100 metres relay

W45 4x100 metres relay

W50 4x100 metres relay

W55 4x100 metres relay

W65 4x100 metres relay

W70 4x100 metres relay

W75 4x100 metres relay

W80 4x100 metres relay

4x400 metres relay
W35 4x400 metres relay

W40 4x400 metres relay

W45 4x400 metres relay

W50 4x400 metres relay

W55 4x400 metres relay

W60 4x400 metres relay

W65 4x400 metres relay

W70 4x400 metres relay

W75 4x400 metres relay

W80 4x400 metres relay

High Jump

W35 High Jump

W40 High Jump

W45 High Jump

W50 High Jump

W55 High Jump

W60 High Jump

W65 High Jump

W70 High Jump

W75 High Jump

W80 High Jump

Pole Vault

W35 Pole Vault

W40 Pole Vault

W45 Pole Vault

W50 Pole Vault

W55 Pole Vault

W60 Pole Vault

W65 Pole Vault

W70 Pole Vault

Long Jump

W35 Long Jump

W40 Long Jump

W45 Long Jump

W50 Long Jump

W55 Long Jump

W60 Long Jump

W65 Long Jump

W70 Long Jump

W75 Long Jump

W80 Long Jump

W85 Long Jump

Triple Jump

W35 Triple Jump

W40 Triple Jump

W45 Triple Jump

W50 Triple Jump

W55 Triple Jump

W60 Triple Jump

W65 Triple Jump

W70 Triple Jump

W75 Triple Jump

W80 Triple Jump

W85 Triple Jump

Shot Put

W35 Shot Put

W40 Shot Put

W45 Shot Put

W50 Shot Put

W55 Shot Put

W60 Shot Put

W65 Shot Put

W70 Shot Put

W75 Shot Put

W80 Shot Put

W85 Shot Put

W90 Shot Put

W95 Shot Put

Discus Throw

W35 Discus Throw

W40 Discus Throw

W45 Discus Throw

W50 Discus Throw

W55 Discus Throw

W60 Discus Throw

W65 Discus Throw

W70 Discus Throw

W75 Discus Throw

W80 Discus Throw

W90 Discus Throw

Hammer Throw

W35 Hammer Throw

W40 Hammer Throw

W45 Hammer Throw

W50 Hammer Throw

W55 Hammer Throw

W60 Hammer Throw

W65 Hammer Throw

W70 Hammer Throw

W75 Hammer Throw

W80 Hammer Throw

W85 Hammer Throw

Javelin Throw
W35 Javelin Throw

W40 Javelin Throw

W45 Javelin Throw

W50 Javelin Throw

W55 Javelin Throw

W60 Javelin Throw

W65 Javelin Throw

W70 Javelin Throw

W75 Javelin Throw

W80 Javelin Throw

W90 Javelin Throw

Weight Throw
W35 Weight Throw

W40 Weight Throw

W45 Weight Throw

W50 Weight Throw

W55 Weight Throw

W60 Weight Throw

W65 Weight Throw

W70 Weight Throw

W75 Weight Throw

W80 Weight Throw

Heptathlon

W35 Heptathlon

W40 Heptathlon

W45 Heptathlon

W50 Heptathlon

W55 Heptathlon

W60 Heptathlon

W65 Heptathlon

W70 Heptathlon

W75 Heptathlon

W80 Heptathlon

Throws Pentathlon

W35 Throws Pentathlon

W40 Throws Pentathlon

W45 Throws Pentathlon

W50 Throws Pentathlon

W55 Throws Pentathlon

W60 Throws Pentathlon

W65 Throws Pentathlon

W70 Throws Pentathlon

W75 Throws Pentathlon

W80 Throws Pentathlon

5000 metres Racewalk

W35 5000 metres Racewalk

W40 5000 metres Racewalk

W45 5000 metres Racewalk

W50 5000 metres Racewalk

W55 5000 metres Racewalk

W60 5000 metres Racewalk

W65 5000 metres Racewalk

W70 5000 metres Racewalk

W75 5000 metres Racewalk

W80 5000 metres Racewalk

W85 5000 metres Racewalk

W90 5000 metres Racewalk

10,000 metres race walk

W35 10,000 metres race walk

W40 10,000 metres race walk

W45 10,000 metres race walk

W50 10,000 metres race walk

W55 10,000 metres race walk

W60 10,000 metres race walk

W65 10,000 metres race walk

W70 10,000 metres race walk

W75 10,000 metres race walk

W80 10,000 metres race walk

W85 10,000 metres race walk

W90 10,000 metres race walk

20,000 metres race walk

W35 20,000 metres race walk

W40 20,000 metres race walk

W45 20,000 metres race walk

W50 20,000 metres race walk

W55 20,000 metres race walk

W60 20,000 metres race walk

W65 20,000 metres race walk

W70 20,000 metres race walk

W75 20,000 metres race walk

See also
 2016 World Masters Athletics Championships Men

References

External links
Complete results

World Masters Athletics Championships
World Masters Athletics Championships
International athletics competitions hosted by Australia
World Masters Athletics Championships